Motril is a town and municipality on the Mediterranean coast in Granada, Spain. It is the second largest town in the province, with a population of 60,368 as of 2016.

History 
Although its origin still remains unclear, it was a Phoenician enclave. It already existed in Roman times.

When the Christians conquered Motril, there were 2,000 inhabitants whose main activities were agriculture, fishing and the production of silk and sugar. Outside the city there were two suburbs: Al-Majon suburb and al-Couruch suburb and a neighborhood called Jandara.

There was a Morisco uprising in 1569 that finished in 1570 with the Christians' victory. This caused a recession in sugar production, which finished 5 years later with the repopulation of old Christians.

By the end of the 1600s, Nuestra Señora de la Cabeza church was built.

Sugar cane was the main crop, which was later processed in the sugar refineries. The most important of these was "La Casa de la Palma". Now it's the place where the "Museo Preindustrial de la Caña de Azúcar" or Sugar Cane Museum is found.

In 1657, Philip IV granted Motril the title of city, separating its jurisdiction from Granada.

At the beginning of the next century, Philip V distinguished Motril as "Muy Noble y Leal" (Very Noble and Loyal), a motto show on the current Motril's shield.

After the War of Independence, in which Motril was occupied by French troops, the city started a new expansion of sugarcane and the sugar industry.

In the 19th century, Motril participated in a singular event, it was proclaimed Independent Canton from July 22 to 25, 1873. 
In a few years, due to the increase in the number of sugar refineries, it went to the first position in the Granada industrial ranking. It opened to the public on the most traditional ride in the city, "Las Explanadas", in the mid-19th century.

Monuments

Sugar cane refineries 
Motril is synonymous with sugar and sugar cane. The process from sugar cane transformation into various types of sugar, even liquors like the cherished rum of Motril, has always been the basis of the local economy. Sugar refineries were for many years the "future" of the city. Now they are one of Motril's legacies.

Sugar cane refineries in Motril are
 Nuestra Señora del Pilar.
 Nuestra Señora de la Almudena.
 Azucarera de San Luis.
 Nuestra Señora de Lourdes.
 Nuestra Señora de la Cabeza (Alcoholera).
 Nuestra Señora de las Angustias (Fabriquilla).
 Azucarera de San Fernando (sólo queda la chimenea).
 Ingenio de San José, El Varadero (sólo queda una nave).

Nuestra Señora de la Cabeza (Alcoholera) 

This refinery is located next to the public swimming pool and the Parque de las Américas.
It was founded by the Larios family in 1885, a family which founded a company based on the production of sugar and alcohol.
At present, the company makes gin.

History 

In the past, many people lived thanks to the work of the refineries due to the sugar cane. Due to the low salaries, later, the workers burned the refinery. The sugar refinery will not be destroyed, as the Town Hall wanted, because it has been declared of historic heritage by the Andalusian Government. Also the chimney, store, distillery and the terrain are protected.

Nuestra Señora de las Angustias (La Fabriquilla) 

Leaving Motril, towards Puntalón and La Garnatilla we find the sugar refinery of Nuestra Señora de las Angustias, dated 1868 and from which are restored some premises now intended for municipal usage, highlighting the magnificent "Nave de los Arcos". Juan Ramón La Chica owned two refineries called "Nuestra Señora de las Angustias", but one of them was in Granada and the other one in Motril. He gained full ownership over this last one in 1874. He also owned another sugar cane refinery called "Nuestra Señora del Carmen" in Pinos Puente (Granada).

Religious buildings 
 Iglesia Mayor de la Encarnación.
 Santuario de Nuestra Señora de la Cabeza (conocido como "El Cerro de la Virgen")
 Iglesia de la Divina Pastora (Capuchinos).
 Santuario de Nuestra Señora de la Victoria.
 Ermita de la Virgen del Carmen.
 Iglesia del Convento de las Nazarenas.
 Ermita de Nuestra Señora de las Angustias.
 Ermita de San Antonio de Padua.
 Ermita de San Nicolás.
 Ermita del Señor de Junes.
 Capilla del Santo Rosario

Santuario de Nuestra Señora de la Cabeza 

This church is one of the most important and emblematic monuments in Motril. It is on a hill called Virgin's Hill. The church was built on the ruins of a nazari (Nasrid) fortress in the 17th century by the architect Isidro de la Chica. The building was damaged during the Civil War in the 20th century and it was restored by the sculptor Manuel Gonzales, a sculptor from Motril, in the 1960s. Inside the church is the patron saint of Motril, the Virgen de la Cabeza. Nowadays, the church is next to the Parque de los Pueblos de América and the first fountain built in Motril where there is a big Spanish flag.

Population 
Motril has 61,171 inhabitants spread out over 110 km2 . There has been an increase of the population. Emigration was the first cause. Until 1610 there were 4,300 inhabitants. In 2012 there were 61,171 inhabitants. The population kept growing the last centuries.

Economy

Agriculture 
Situated on the south coast of Andalusia, Motril has main crops like avocado, custard apple, guava, mango, and banana, as well as greenhouse cultivation and sugarcane (but 2006 was the last year in which sugarcane was cultivated).

In the ancient countryside of Motril was very important the sugarcane to the production of sugar, for that Motril have several sugar refineries such as:
 "Nuestra Señora del Pilar"
 "Nuestra Señora de la Almudena"
 "Azucarera de San Luis"
 "Nuestra señora de Lourdes"
 "Nuestra Señora de la Cabeza"
 "Nuestra Señora de las Angustias"
 "Azucarera de San Fernando"
 "Ingenio de San José, El Varadero"

These refineries are now abandoned. The potato was also very significant.

Motril and the villages of its municipality: Carchuna, Calahonda, Castel de Ferro ... live on the crops in the greenhouse. On the one hand, we have crops in the greenhouse, the more important are the tomatoes and the cucumbers. And on the other hand, in more reduced proportion crops such as custard apple, beans and peas.

Industry 
Its geographical position makes it a commercial and industrial center. One of the essential industries in Motril, besides greenhouse agriculture, is the paper mill that gives 400 jobs and produces around 250 tons of paper per year. "The Port of Motril" is a commercial and fishing port.

Climate 
The climate in Motril is determined by two important geographic factors:
 The Sierra de Lújar blocks cold winds from the north (Granada and Sierra Nevada).
 The Mediterranean Sea, to the south, functions as a thermal regulator.
The combination of both factors allows the presence of a subtropical microclimate. The annual average temperature is between 18 and 20 degrees Celsius. Summers are hot, with high temperatures between 27 and 31 degrees and low temperatures between 18 and 22 degrees while winters are mild, with high temperatures usually over 17-18 degrees and low temperatures between 9-10 degrees. The African continent helps to cushion the hard effects of Atlantic and Mediterranean climate, providing warm breezes from the south.

Motril has a hot semi-arid climate (Köppen: BSh) with very mild winters and hot, very dry summers.

Culture
Motril's theater, named Teatro Calderón de la Barca, organises many shows such as plays, exhibitions,concerts and monologues; and there is a local orchestra, the "Joven Orquesta Ciudad de Motril".
In Motril, there is a strong music development. Young people study several instruments at the professional conservatory and there is a local music school too. You can also find many small music bands created by Motrilians.

Flamenco is also performed here in dance academies and exhibitions along the whole year, specially in the Cruces. Flamenco is the most characteristic dance style but other style are also practised, like ballet.

Youth Area proposes many activities organised by local associations to contribute to the city's leisure like video games tournaments, crafts workshops and once a year, an event called Encuentro Joven where young people and children meet and these association prepares games to pass a journey all together and meet new people. This area has a centre called the Centro Joven where expositions of young local artists draws are passed so it helps to get to know their work.

Holy Week
The Holy week in Motril has been declared National Tourist Interest, It consist of 12 brotherhood, 23 pasos and more than 6000 followers. There are processions every day.
The Holy week in Motril started in 1600 with the eldest brotherhood, called Vera Cruz. After the civil war every brotherhood had to restore its patrimony.

Almost all the statues in Motril are made by some artists from the province of Granada.
The most interesting processions are:

-The starting procession is on Palm Sunday. In this procession we can see two different pasos, it is so interesting because there is a lot of people that accompany it with palm.

-On Easter Sunday there is a procession called Dulce Nombre de Jesus, it is really special. It consists on a group of children carrying the statue. It is accompanied by a lot of little children carrying bells.

Nowadays, the members of the brotherhood accompany the image with special clothes that cover their face.

In Spain there is a tradition of not to eat meat on Holy Thursday and on Good Friday.
Each city has their own stew. The typical menu in Motril is the stew made with chickpeas and cod, the cod with tomato, and some cod omelette. Also, there are different desserts like rice pudding, torrija ... In these days it's common meeting the family.

Cuisine 

The most popular dish from Motril is migas (crumbs), made of bread. Fish is also very popular in Motril, due to the town's important fisheries. The most popular fish are anchovy (locally named  boquerón), sardines and shrimp. The most famous drink, exclusive to the area, is ron pálido which is a locally produced rum.

Leisure
Motril is a growing dynamic city, a place of service where visitors feel at home, thanks to the great hospitality of its people.
You can visit many places to have fun and meet new people, for example:

-Paseo de las explanadas: pubs normally open from 4 pm until 4 am.

-Parque de los Pueblos de América: The main feature of this park is great variety of tropical flora to be found in it.

Beaches 
Motril is within the Costa Tropical, a large tourist region on the coast. Motril has small beaches (bays) and large beaches (like Playa Granada). They are popular during the summer with people from the surrounding as well as the interior regions. The main problems are the wind and the jellyfish.

Beaches in the area include Playa de Poniente (a large gravel/shingle beach), Playa Granada (shingles), Playa Carchuna (gravel and pebbles), and Playa Calahonda (gravel). Many of the area's beaches include car parking facilities, first aid stands, showers, beach cleaning, bars and restaurants, typical beach facilities (such as beach umbrellas and hammocks) and S.O.S. telephones.

Transport
Motril is served by autovías A-7 to Málaga and Almería, and A-44 to Granada. The Port of Motril offers ferries to Melilla, Nador, Tanger-Med, and Al-Hoceima and shipped 2.8 million tonnes of cargo in 2019. Motril is the only Spanish Mediterranean port that lacks a rail service; building a line which would take 25 minutes to travel to Granada railway station was estimated to cost €400 million in 2017. The link to Granada was rejected in 2010 by the Ministry of Development on the basis of being unsuitable for freight railway transport due to the steep slope. From 1925 to 1950, Motril was connected to Granada by means of a cable way that spanned from Motril to Dúrcal.

Time capsule 

On July 22, 2008, a second time capsule in Spain was buried as part of an official event organized to commemorate the 135th anniversary of the cantonal movement in Motril, which began on July 22, 1873, and ended on 25 March. The president of the canton was Ruperto Vidaurreta de la Camara. This time capsule will be opened on July 22, 2023, to celebrate the 150th anniversary of this event. It is located at coordinates

Festivities

January 13- Earthquake Day

Its story is particularly tragic: On 13 January 1804 there was a very strong earthquake which had devastating effects: it caused the partial destruction of the city and the death of two people. Currently it recalls a vote conducted by the neighborhood because of the misfortunes suffered by hundreds of families during these disastrous years.

February 28- Día de Andalucía

This day, Andalusia's flag is hoisted at Puchilla's roundabout and the Andalusian anthem is sung. On this day there are numerous acts of civil and military authorities. A popular race is also celebrated in which the runners go from the square of the "Explanadas" to the fire station in the port. After this race there are numerous sports-related activities.

May 3- Festivities of "Las Cruces"

Motril is considered the second most famous city of "Las Cruces", after Córdoba. It's an important festivity considered National Tourist Interest. During the three days of celebration there are several types of singing and dancing shows. There are carriages decorated with traditional objects of the popular culture around the town and in some special squares neighbours make big crosses decorated with flowers. The most typical clothing for this day is the flamenco outfit.

June 24- San Juan

Bonfires are lit on the beach, and people are allowed to camp, there is a tradition by which you throw three wishes written on a piece of paper into the fire and throw three negatives ideas into the sea for the tide to take them.

June 13- Romería de San Antonio

It is celebrated on 13 June and it is celebrated in the north of Motril, in the neighbourhood where there is the old chapel of the Saint. The neighbourhood helps with the organization of this event.

July 16- Festivities of "La Virgen del Carmen", on the port.

These are the festivities of the neighbourhood "El Varadero", on Motril's port. There, a mass in the "Lonja Pesquera" is celebrated and fishermen sing a Salve Mariner. At sunset, after a procession in the streets, the virgin is boarded and leaves from the port followed by all the fleet, decorated for the events. In this festivity show fireworks.

August 15- Patronal festivities of Motril

In the first half of August the patronal festivities of Motril in honour of the "Virgen de la Cabeza" are celebrated. On these weeks, different events are celebrated in the "Ferial del Cortijo del Conde", with some concerts, night fair, dances, sport shows, fireworks with music on the beach, morning fair ... On the 15th, the Virgin goes through the city streets.

These two popular neighbourhoods of Motril celebrate their patronal celebrations during the month of October. Both the "Virgen de Las Angustias" and the " Virgen de la Pastora" leave their churches and they go all over the neighbourhoods with the fervour of their neighbours.

Sister cities 
  Albardón, Argentina
  Marple, United Kingdom
  Melilla, Spain
  Agounit, Sahrawi Arab Democratic Republic
  Smolyan, Bulgaria

Sports 
The town has a football team, Motril CF.

Notable people
José Callejón (born 1987), professional footballer.

References

External links 

• Chat de Motril
 Costa Tropical & Motril Tourist Info
 Costa tropical
 Motril.org Local History
 Paseo virtual por Motril
 English News Magazine for the Region
 El Cultura Motril
 Ruta de las azucareras
 elculturalmotril.es
 Santuario de Nuestra Sra. de la Cabeza en Motril

Municipalities in the Province of Granada